The War of the Roses is the name of a radio skit which is a registered service mark owned by the Capstar Radio Operating Company, a subsidiary of iHeartMedia

Format
The general format of the skit is that the host of a radio show calls a male with an offer of free roses, then asks the male where he would like to have them delivered. However, the female is in fact silently listening to the call the entire time, having previously been contacted by the host.

During the skit, the host asks the suspect questions that will hopefully reveal the identity of the subject of their affair, and other questions that may help understand the nature of it. For example, the host will typically ask the suspect for one or two sentences to be used as an optional "personal message" to be included with the gift, before asking for the name of the desired recipient. Once the man gives up the name and reveals the secret relationship, the woman is free to jump in and chastise the guilty party over the phone.

The ruse may be improvised depending on what is believed to most likely attract the suspect's attention. Examples used include free concert tickets for a man who "couldn't stop talking about how Beyoncé is coming to town next week but who still hasn't asked [his wife] to go" with him, or a purported call from a venereal disease clinic. The VD ruse involved stating that "someone with a disease listed you as a recent sexual partner, but we can only tell you more (for confidentiality reasons) if you can tell us the name of the person who might have referred you".

Often, the target is confused and bewildered when confronted on the phone, because they are unaware that they've been taken in by a ruse, and often can't believe their significant other is really listening on an extension. Suspects who believe this continue with the prize dialogue with the radio station host and continue to embarrass themselves, unaware that the entire call is a prank.

Other suspects turn out to not be cheating at all, and end up sending the roses - and the embarrassment along with them - to their significant other who initiated the call.

History

War of the Roses was created in early 1994 by Los Angeles radio personality Rick Dees shortly after receiving word that crosstown KGGI Riverside/San Bernardino morning show host Sean "Hollywood" Hamilton was having tremendous rating success with a similar feature called "Bait Your Mate". Since 2012, Hamilton, who now hosts War of the Roses, continues to dominated in New York City ratings.

One of the earliest known segments was done in 1996 on Andy Savage's radio program "The Edge" based in Minneapolis, Minnesota.  While Savage has claimed the bit was real, it is still up for debate as mentioned by Snopes.com At an internal company ceremony recognizing Dave Ryan's 25th Anniversary at KDWB, program director Rich Davis told the crowd that Ryan has to "think of new ideas for War of the Roses every week." While Ryan immediately responded "But it's real," Davis's impromptu quip lends evidence to the conclusion that this program element may not be completely authentic.

Station list

 Mad Dog & Maura show on Virgin Radio CKFM in Toronto, ON, Canada
 The Wake Up Call on 107.9 KDND 107.9 in Sacramento, CA
 The Dave Ryan in The Morning Show on KDWB in Minneapolis, MN
 On Air with Ryan Seacrest 102.7 KIIS FM (Los Angeles, CA)
 Roula & Ryan on 104.1 KRBE in Houston, TX
 JohnJay And Rich Show KISS FM in Phoenix, AZ
 Your Morning Show on HOT 99.5 in Washington, DC, and Z104.3 in Baltimore
 The Joe Show on 93.3 FLZ Tampa
 The Mojo in the Morning Show on WKQI in Detroit, MI
 Courtney and Kiss in the Morning Kiss 95.7 Hartford, CT
 Hollywood Hamilton afternoon show on WKTU 103.5FM in New York, NY.
 La jungla de la mañana en la nueva mega 94.9 WZTU en Miami, FL
 Jagger and Kristi Magic 92.5 San Diego, CA
 The Mix Morning Fix on 105.1 KUDD in Salt Lake City, UT

References

1996 radio programme debuts
American radio sketch shows
Prank calling